Subliminal... is an album led by jazz double bassist Scott Colley which was recorded in 1997 and released by the Criss Cross Jazz label.

Reception

The AllMusic review by David R. Adler states "Scott Colley's writing reaches new heights on this very fine record ... the bassist delivers some of his most memorable compositions to date ... A superb, well-rounded, cohesive effort".

Track listing
All compositions by Scott Colley except where noted
 "Don't Ever Call Me Again" (Bill Stewart) – 5:48
 "Sublimal..." – 8:13
 "The End and the Beginning" – 4:34
 "Turangalila" (Chris Potter) – 7:33
 "Out of the Void" – 7:30
 "Segment" (Charlie Parker) – 5:35
 "Is What It Is" – 6:07
 "Impossible Vacation" – 6:11
 "Verbatim" – 6:23

Personnel
Scott Colley − bass
Chris Potter - tenor saxophone, bass clarinet
Bill Carrothers − piano
Bill Stewart - drums

References

Scott Colley albums
1998 albums
Criss Cross Jazz albums